Keith Frank Stock (born 18 March 1957) is a male retired British athlete. Stock competed in the men's pole vault at the 1984 Summer Olympics. He represented England in the pole vault event, at the 1982 Commonwealth Games in Brisbane, Queensland, Australia.

References

1957 births
Living people
Athletes (track and field) at the 1984 Summer Olympics
British male pole vaulters
Olympic athletes of Great Britain
Athletes (track and field) at the 1982 Commonwealth Games
Commonwealth Games competitors for England